The Parliamentary Under-Secretary of State for Mental Health and Women's Health Strategy is a ministerial position within the Government of the United Kingdom, in charge of mental health and women's health policy.

History 
Following the general election in June 2017, Prime Minister Theresa May appointed Jackie Doyle-Price as the UK's first minister with responsibility for mental health. The portfolio was further expanded in October 2018, on World Mental Health Day, to include suicide prevention. This occurred while the UK government hosted the first ever global mental health summit. 

In July 2019, Nadine Dorries was appointed to the position in the incoming Johnson ministry, with additional responsibility for patient safety. As minister, Dorries assumed responsibility for the government's response to the impact of the COVID-19 pandemic on people's mental health. The minister committed to an increase in government spending on mental health as a result of the lockdowns during the COVID-19 pandemic. In May 2020, the position was raised from Parliamentary Under-Secretary of State to Minister of State.

During the cabinet reshuffle in September 2021, Gillian Keegan was appointed Minister of State for Care and Mental Health, a position which combined with the mental health and social care portfolios. In June 2022, the department published the Draft Mental Health Bill, stating the government's intention to modernise the existing Mental Health Act 1983.

In September 2022, the incoming Truss ministry divided the mental health and care portfolios and appointed Caroline Johnson to the former, with responsibility for mental health and public health. Dr Johnson's tenure was unusually short, due to the collapse of the government in the following month. In October 2022, Maria Caulfield was appointed and given responsibility for mental health and women's health in the Sunak ministry.

Responsibilities 
The Parliamentary Under-Secretary of State for Mental Health and Women's Health Strategy leads on the following:
 women’s health
 maternity services
 gender identity services
 cosmetic regulation
 DHSC litigation
 mental health:
 children and young people and early intervention
 Mental Health Act
 suicide prevention and crisis prevention
 bereavement
 disabilities, including autism
 offender health
 patient safety:
 clinical negligence
 historic inquiries
 quality regulation
 death certification
 indemnity
 Patient Safety Commissioner
 Vaccine Damage Payment Scheme
 patient experience:
 ombudsman, complaints
 whistleblowing, health ethics
 Government Equalities Office portfolio
 UK Health Security Agency (UKHSA):
 COVID-19 – COVID-19 status certification, variant tracing, shielding
 environmental health (air quality, chemicals, radiation)
 health security at the border
 infectious diseases (including monkeypox)
 seasonal flu
 vaccines:
 COVID-19 vaccine deployment and uptake
 routine immunisations and vaccinations
 emergency preparedness including Ukraine
 sponsorship of:
 Healthcare Safety Investigation Branch (HSIB)
 Care Quality Commission (CQC)
 NHS Resolution
 Human Fertilisation and Embryology Authority (HFEA)
 Human Tissue Authority (HTA)
 UKHSA

List of ministers

See also 
 Mental health minister

Notes

References 

Health ministers of the United Kingdom
Department of Health and Social Care
Health in the United Kingdom
Mental health in the United Kingdom
Suicide prevention